2008 Peshawar bombing may refer to:
September 2008 Peshawar bombing
December 2008 Peshawar bombing